Beme may refer to:

 Beme (company)
 Beme (app)
 Beme Seed, American psychedelic noise rock band
 Lake Beme, Cameroon
 SS Beme, a list of ships with this name

See also
Beam (disambiguation)